Presidential elections were held in the Central African Republic on 19 September 1999. The result was a victory for incumbent President Ange-Félix Patassé of the Movement for the Liberation of the Central African People, who received 51.33% of the vote in the first round, meaning that a second round was not required. Voter turnout was 59.1%. 

Prior to Constitutional Court head Édouard Frank announcing the results, all nine opposition candidates rejected the outcome, claiming the elections were rigged. However, observers stated that any malpractice was not enough to have changed the results.

Results

References

Central African Republic
1999 in the Central African Republic
Presidential elections in the Central African Republic